The Cuban Institute of Radio and Television (ICRT) is the government agency responsible for the control of radio and television broadcasters in Cuba.

History 
Cuba was one of the first countries in the Americas to have radio and television service. In 1922, under the cooperation of the US-based International Telephone and Telegraph, the first radio station in the country (2LC) began broadcasts on 22 August. However, the first regular broadcasts were made by the PWX on 10 October, with the issuance of a speech by President Alfredo Zayas y Alfonso. The radio stations in the country were developed by private initiatives, and its programming was initially based on news and entertainment.

The popularity of radio led to the development and launch of television stations. The first years of television in Cuba were marked by a climate of competitiveness between two Cuban businessmen who were backed by US companies, Gaspar Pumarejo by DuMont and Goar Mestre by RCA Victor. Mestre started construction of a building called Radio Center, inspired by the Radio City in New York, while Gaspar Pumarejo tried to develop a television studio in his own home in his quest to be the first in establishing a TV station.

Pumarejo's channel 4 (Unión Radio Televisión) was the first TV channel to start broadcasts in the island; it began broadcasting on 24 October 1950 with an address by President Carlos Prío Socarrás from the Presidential Palace. Mestre began broadcasts on Channel 6 (CMQ) on 18 December of that year, and both networks would develop a program format similar to their radio brethren, in addition to live sports and special events. On 18 February 1953, Channel 2 (Telemundo) began its broadcasts.

With the advent of the Cuban Revolution in 1959, the new government applied a series of measures that transformed all national media. Radio Rebelde, the first radio station developed under the revolution, started broadcasting on 24 February.

During the early years of the revolution there was a division between the mainstream media in Cuba, created with private capital and oriented against the new political situation and a series of small radio stations whose editorial line was in favor of the new government, which organized an "Independent Front of Free Broadcasters". These radio stations were recognized as official by the new government. The government would develop a Bureau of Broadcasting, attached to the Ministry of Communications and under the political leadership of the Communist Party of Cuba. Private television stations were expropriated; Mestre's channel 6 was taken over by the state in 1960. Radio stations and television channels in the country were completely put under state control on 24 May 1962 under the management of the newly established Cuban Broadcasting Institute. Under the new broadcasting system, all media were to meet a set of values established by the government to strengthen the political process in the country, some names of TV and radio stations were changed, and the coverage of the TV and radio services were extended to reach the whole country. In 1975, the agency changed its name to the Cuban Institute of Radio and Television.

Channels

Radio 

The ICRT has several nationwide radio stations:
 Radio Rebelde
 Radio Progreso
 Radio Taíno
 Radio Reloj
 CMBF Radio Musical Nacional
 Radio Enciclopedia

Related:
 Cuban Radio Official Website in english
 Cuban Radio Official Website in spanish
The ICRT also has several regional radio stations and Radio Havana Cuba, an international broadcaster.

Television 

Cuba has five national television channels, which are known for airing various kinds of locally produced programming (soap operas, recitals, documentaries and comedy programs), but these networks also have begun airing foreign children and family-focused programming, even from the United States.

 Cubavisión (founded in 1950)
 Tele Rebelde (founded in 1968)
 Canal Educativo (founded 2001)
 Canal Educativo 2 (founded in 2004)
 Multivisión (founded in 2008)
 Canal Caribe (founded in 2017; Cuba's first Digital-only channel)

The institute also includes a network of provincial channels; Cubavision International, which broadcasts via a number of satellite services; and the Cuban Television Information System (Sistema Informativo de la Televisión Cubana), the national producer of all TV news programs aired on the ICRT stations as well as of important state events.

See also
 Media of Cuba
 List of newspapers in Cuba
 Telecommunications in Cuba
 Internet in Cuba
 Censorship in Cuba

References

External links 
 Information System of Cuban Television 
 Full details on how to receive free-to-air Cubavision International broadcasts 

Television in Cuba
Government agencies of Cuba
Radio stations established in 1922
Television channels and stations established in 1950